Vinícius Gonçalves Boff (born 10 February 1999), known as Vinícius Boff, is a Brazilian footballer who plays as either an attacking midfielder or a forward for Cuiabá.

Club career
Born in Rondonópolis, Mato Grosso, Vinícius Boff made his senior debut with hometown side União Rondonópolis in the 2017 Série D. In 2018, he moved on loan to Atlético Goianiense, but only featured for their under-23 squad.

Back to União for the 2019 season, Vinícius Boff featured sparingly before moving abroad in July, with Portuguese side Alverca. The following January, after only playing for their B-team, he was loaned to Campeonato de Portugal club Fabril Barreiro.

Back to Alverca and their B-team, Vinícius Boff returned to Fabril on loan on 28 January 2021. He subsequently returned to his home country and joined , helping in their promotion from the Campeonato Mato-Grossense Second Division and subsequently renewing his contract until the end of the 2022 Campeonato Mato-Grossense.

On 9 April 2022, Vinícius Boff signed for Série A side Cuiabá, being initially assigned to the under-23 team. On 30 September, after being an important unit in the club's first ever Campeonato Brasileiro de Aspirantes title, he renewed his contract until 2024.

Vinícius Boff made his debut in the top tier of Brazilian football on 27 October 2022, coming on as a late substitute for Marllon in a 1–0 home win over Avaí.

Career statistics

Honours
Cuiabá
Campeonato Brasileiro de Aspirantes: 2022

References

External links

1999 births
Living people
Sportspeople from Mato Grosso
Brazilian footballers
Association football midfielders
Association football forwards
Campeonato Brasileiro Série A players
Campeonato Brasileiro Série D players
Campeonato de Portugal (league) players
União Esporte Clube players
Atlético Clube Goianiense players
F.C. Alverca players
G.D. Fabril players
Cuiabá Esporte Clube players